Adrián Zela Terry (Lima, Lima Province, Peru, 20 March 1989), is a Peruvian  footballer.  Currently he plays centre back for Sport Boys.  He is also the great-nephew of Alberto Terry.

Club career
Zela came through the youth ranks of Alianza Lima.  However, he did not make an appearance for their senior team.  In mid-2007, Adrian joined Coronel Bolognesi.  He made his senior club debut for them in 2008.  In December 2009 was transferred to Club Universitario de Deportes.

Honours

Club
Coronel Bolognesi:
Torneo Clausura: 1
2007
Deportivo Municipal:
Segunda División Peruana 2014

References

External links
 
 

1989 births
Living people
Footballers from Lima
Association football central defenders
Peruvian footballers
Coronel Bolognesi footballers
Club Universitario de Deportes footballers
Deportivo Municipal footballers
Sport Boys footballers
Peruvian Primera División players